Katarzyna Daleszczyk (born 23 March 1990) is a Polish football midfielder who plays for Sassuolo and the Poland national team.

International goals

References

External links
 
 
 

1990 births
U.S. Sassuolo Calcio (women) players
Expatriate women's footballers in Italy
Living people
Place of birth missing (living people)
Polish expatriate footballers
Polish expatriate sportspeople in Italy
Polish women's footballers
Poland women's international footballers
Women's association football midfielders